Castello Mediceo (Italian for Mediceo Castle)  is a  Middle Ages castle in Bussi sul Tirino, Province of Pescara (Abruzzo).

History

Architecture

References

External links

Mediceo
Bussi sul Tirino